Stephen Derek Potter (born 1955 in Belper, Derbyshire) is a former footballer. He was apprenticed at age 15 with Manchester City Football Club. Potter transferred to Swansea City and made 118 appearances as a goalkeeper for Swansea City between 1974 and 1978 before moving to Bridgend Town in July 1978. After a short stint with Bridgend to maintain fitness, Steve moved to Vancouver, Canada, to play for the Vancouver White Caps Football Club in the then bourgening North American League.  He received an offer to play for a Melbourne club and subsequently emigrated to Australia.  Potter retired in the early 1980s and now lives in Queensland.

References

External links 
 Swansea City F.C.

1955 births
Living people
Swansea City A.F.C. players
Manchester City F.C. players
Association football goalkeepers
English footballers